This is a list of public art in the London Borough of Wandsworth.

Battersea

Battersea Park
Battersea Park has a history of displaying sculpture by major artists, with large triennial exhibitions in the 1940s, 50s and 60s, although the 1954 and 1957 exhibitions took place in Holland Park instead of Battersea Park.
More recently the park presents an annual student sculpture prize with the winning sculpture going on show in for a year. Some of the current sculptures have remained in the park since the large exhibitions.

1948 Open Air Exhibition of Sculpture
This was the first event of its type in Britain and showed 43 sculptures between May and September. The exhibition was extremely successful with over 170,000 visitors.

Selected sculptors and works:
Auguste Rodin – The Age of Bronze/Man Awakening to Nature
Ossip Zadkine – Laokoon
Charles Despiau – Eve
Henri Matisse – a bas-relief
Barbara Hepworth – Helikon
Henri Laurens – Les Ondines
Eric Gill – Mankind
Henry Moore – Recumbent Figure 1938, Three Standing Figures 1947
Jacques Lipchitz – Figure
Aristide Maillol – The Three Graces, Venus with necklace
Jacob Epstein – Girl with Gardenias, The Visitation

1951 exhibition 'Sculpture'
44 sculptures including ones by Mari Andriessen, Bill?, Butler?, Siegfried Charoux, Charles Despiau, Dobson, Jacob Epstein, Alberto Giacometti, Eric Gill, Henning?, Barbara Hepworth, Maurice Lambert, Jacques Lipchitz, Aristide Maillol, Giacomo Manzù, Constantin Meunier, Henry Moore, Antoine Pevsner?, Auguste Rodin and Karel Vogel?.

1960 exhibition 'Sculpture in the open air'
42 sculptures were shown from British and French contemporary sculptors.

List of sculptors:
Adams?, Kenneth Armitage, Jean Arp, Mark Batten, André Bloc, Brown?, Butler, Anthony Caro, Clatworthy, Lynn Chadwick, Siegfried Charoux, Richard Bentley Claughton, Marta Colvin, Hubert Dalwood, Dow?, Alan Durst, Jacob Epstein, Elisabeth Frink, Alfred Gerrard, Dora Gordine, Barbara Hepworth, Jean-Robert Ipoustéguy, Phillip King? or Peter King?, Eric Kennington, Gilbert Ledward, F. E. McWilliam, Martin?, Bernard Meadows, Henry Moore, Uli Nimptsch, Eduardo Paolozzi, Pablo Picasso, Germaine Richier, John Skeaping, François Stahly, William Turnbull, Josefina de Vasconcellos, Vogel, Charles Wheeler, Ossip Zadkine.
Silent film from British Pathé of the sculptures
News report from British Pathé of the sculptures

1963 London County Council exhibition 'Sculpture in the open air'
42 sculptures were shown, mainly from British and American contemporary artists.

List of sculptors:
Adams, Peter Agostini, Kenneth Armitage, Leonard Baskin, Harry Bertoia, Brown, Butler, Anthony Caro, Alexander Calder, Lynn Chadwick, John Chamberlain, Geoffrey Clarke, Robert Clatworthy, Hubert Dalwood, George Ehrlich, Herbert Ferber, Elisabeth Frink, George Fullard, Joseph Goto, Dimitri Hadzi, Raoul Hague?, Anthony Hatwell, Barbara Hepworth, John Hoskin, Bryan Kneale, Seymour Lipton, F. E. McWilliam, Bernard Meadows, Henry Moore, Reuben Nakian, Uli Nimptsch, Phillip Pavia, Richmond?, George Rickey, Jose de Rivera, James Rosati, Schmidt?, Jason Seley, David Smith, Richard Stankiewicz, Peter Voulkos, William Turnbull.

1966 Greater London Council exhibition 'Sculpture in the open air'
42 sculptures were shown between May and September

List of sculptors: Adams, David Annesley, Kenneth Armitage, Michael Bolus, Brown, Antanas Braždys, Anthony Caro, Hubert Dalwood, Elisabeth Frink, George Fullard, David Hall, Barbara Hepworth, John Hoskin, Michael Kenny, King, Bryan Kneale, Kim Lim, F. E. McWilliam, Bernard Meadows, Henry Moore, Francis Morland, Eduardo Paolozzi, Pickett?, Scott?, Smith, William G. Tucker, Brian Wall
Silent film from British Pathé of the sculptures and a visit by Princess Margaret

Battersea sculpture prize
Partial table of winners

Current

Nine Elms

Putney

Putney Sculpture Trail

Roehampton

Southfields

Streatham

Tooting

Wandsworth

Wimbledon
Part of Wimbledon lies outside the borough of Wandsworth; for other works located there, see

References

External links
 

Wandsworth
London Borough of Wandsworth